Rakel Laakso (1904–1985) was a Finnish film actress. She was married to the actor Uuno Laakso.

Selected filmography
 A Night in Rio (1951)
 Red Line (1959)

References

Bibliography 
 Tad Bentley Hammer. International film prizes: an encyclopedia. Garland, 1991.

External links 
 

1904 births
1985 deaths
Actresses from Helsinki
People from Uusimaa Province (Grand Duchy of Finland)
Finnish film actresses